Geusenfriedhof is a cemetery in Cologne, Germany. It is the oldest Protestant cemetery in the Rhineland, established around 1584.

References

External links
 

Cemeteries in Cologne